The 1955 Georgia Tech Yellow Jackets football team represented the Georgia Institute of Technology during the 1955 college football season. The Yellow Jackets were led by 11th-year head coach Bobby Dodd and played their home games at Grant Field in Atlanta.

Early victories over Miami (FL) and Florida had Georgia Tech eyeing the Southeastern Conference crown and a possible national championship. But the Yellow Jackets were upset by Auburn at home, their first loss to the Tigers since 1940. Another setback, a tie to Tennessee, kept them from sharing the SEC title with Ole Miss. They finished the regular season ranked 7th in the AP Poll, and accepted an invitation to the 1956 Sugar Bowl, where they defeated Pittsburgh, 7–0.

Schedule

References

Georgia Tech
Georgia Tech Yellow Jackets football seasons
Sugar Bowl champion seasons
Georgia Tech Yellow Jackets football